"He Will Break Your Heart", is a song originally performed and co-written by Jerry Butler, a top-ten hit in 1960.

In 1975, Tony Orlando and Dawn released the song under the title "He Don't Love You (Like I Love You)". Their version topped the Billboard Hot 100 chart on May 3, 1975 and the US adult contemporary chart.

Origins
"He Will Break Your Heart" was written by Jerry Butler, Calvin Carter, and Curtis Mayfield. The song was recorded by Butler and released as a single in 1960, where it peaked at No. 7 on the Billboard Hot 100 chart and No. 3 on the Cash Box Top 100. In addition, Butler's recording spent seven non-consecutive weeks at No. 1 on the U.S. R&B chart.  Subsequent cover versions of "He Will Break Your Heart" were released by artists such as Margie Singleton and Lulu (both regendering the song to She Will Break Your Heart), The Righteous Brothers and Freddie Scott.

Chart history

Tony Orlando and Dawn version
When Orlando and the other members of Dawn (Telma Hopkins and Joyce Vincent Wilson) were waiting in the lobby to go on at a Golden Globes award ceremony, Orlando spoke with Faye Dunaway and her then-husband, Peter Wolf, lead singer for The J. Geils Band. To pass the time, the two began singing various R&B songs from the '60s, including Butler's "He Will Break Your Heart", which the couple recommended that the group record on an upcoming album. Orlando contacted Mayfield requesting permission to do a remake, but to change the song's title to the opening lines, and Mayfield gave his permission. Billboard ranked it as the No. 18 song for 1975.

Their version topped the Billboard Hot 100 chart on May 3, 1975, and remained there for three weeks. The song also went to No. 1 on the US adult contemporary chart for one week in 1975. It was later certified gold by the RIAA.

Another track from the same 1975 album was adapted from an Italian hit by Giorgio Gaber from two years prior entitled Far Finta di Essere Sani recorded in English as Tomorrow's Got to be Sunny. Even though the song did not chart, it became a concert favorite.

Charts

Weekly charts

Year-end charts

Subsequent versions
During the 1960s the song was covered by Margie Singleton, Lulu ("She Will Break Your Heart"), Billy Fury, Bobby Vee, Lloyd Price, Ben E. King, The Merseybeats, Johnny Rivers (title "He Don't Love You, Like I Love You"), Jackie Edwards, among others.

The band Gallery included a version of the song under the name “He Will Break Your Heart” on their 1972 album Nice To Be With You.

Jim Croce included a version of the song as part of his "Chain Gang Medley" (along with Sam Cooke's "Chain Gang", and The Coasters "Searchin'") recorded before his death in 1973, it featured on the 1975 album The Faces I've Been and was a chart success as a single in 1976.

The Greg Kihn Band included a version of the song on their 1976 album, Greg Kihn.

The Walker Brothers also covered the track on their 1975 comeback album No Regrets under the original title "He Will Break Your Heart".

Dolly Parton covered the song in 1984, retaining the Orlando and Dawn retitling, though changing the gender to "She Don't Love You", like Margie Singleton did in 1960 to the original "He Will Break Your Heart" song.  She included the song on The Great Pretender, an album of covers of early rock and roll hits.

Joe Tex made an answer song singing from the perspective of the other man entitled "I Will Never Break Your Heart".

The song "Na Na Hey Hey Kiss Him Goodbye" by Steam shares the same first three lines of its first verse with the chorus of "He Will Break Your Heart."

References

1960 singles
1975 singles
Tony Orlando songs
Jerry Butler songs
Margie Singleton songs
The Walker Brothers songs
Billboard Hot 100 number-one singles
Cashbox number-one singles
Songs written by Curtis Mayfield
Songs written by Jerry Butler
Vee-Jay Records singles
Elektra Records singles
1960 songs